1,1'-Ferrocenedicarboxylic acid is the organoiron compound with the formula .  It is the simplest dicarboxylic acid derivative of ferrocene.  It is a yellow solid that is soluble in aqueous base. The 1,1' part of its name refers to the location of the carboxylic acid groups on separate rings.

It can be prepared by hydrolysis of its diesters  (R = Me, Et), which in turn are obtained by treatment of ferrous chloride with the sodium salt of the carboxyester of cyclopentadienide .

Derivatives of ferrocenedicarboxylic acid are components of some redox switches and redox active coatings.

Related compounds
 Ferrocenecarboxylic acid

References

Ferrocenes
Cyclopentadienyl complexes
Dicarboxylic acids